That's My Boy is a 2012 American satirical black comedy film directed by Sean Anders, written by David Caspe, and produced by Adam Sandler, Jack Giarraputo, Heather Parry, and Allen Covert. It stars Sandler and Andy Samberg in the lead roles, with Leighton Meester, Vanilla Ice, Tony Orlando, Will Forte, Milo Ventimiglia, Susan Sarandon, and James Caan in supporting roles. The film follows Donny Berger (Sandler), a middle-aged alcoholic who once enjoyed celebrity status for being at the center of a teacher-student statutory rape case, as he tries to rekindle his relationship with his adult son, Todd Peterson/Han Solo Berger (Samberg), born as the result of that illicit relationship, in hopes that their televised reunion will earn him enough money to avoid going to prison for tax evasion.

Produced by Sandler's Happy Madison Productions in association with Relativity Media, That's My Boy was released in the United States on June 15, 2012, by Columbia Pictures. It was a critical and commercial failure, being panned by critics, and only grossing $57 million against a $57–70 million budget, becoming a box-office bomb.

Plot
 
In Massachusetts in 1984, young Donald "Donny" Berger flirts with his middle school teacher, Mary McGarricle, who is repulsed by his actions and gives him a month's detention.  However, in detention, Mary seduces Donny and they begin a sexual relationship. Their relationship is discovered during an auditorium speech. Subsequently, Mary is sentenced to 30 years in prison for statutory rape, but the scandal makes Donny famous. Mary is also revealed to be pregnant, and custody of their unborn son is given to Donny's abusive father. When Donny turns 18, he will take full custody.

In the present, Donny is an alcoholic and broke slacker who owes $43,000 to the Internal Revenue Service (IRS) in back-taxes. To avoid going to jail, he places a $20 bet on an 8000:1 runner in an upcoming race, but decides to make a back-up plan should the runner lose. Meanwhile, he has also been estranged from his now 28-year-old son for the past 10 years. To avoid contact with his parents and others discovering the family connection, their son changed his name from Han Solo Berger to Todd Peterson and tells others that his parents died in an explosion. Now a successful businessman, Todd has recently arrived at the Cape Cod house of his boss, Steve Spirou, where he is to marry his fiancée, Jamie.

Randall Morgan, a television producer who worked with Donny during his time as a celebrity, offers him $50,000 if he can organize a reunion with Todd and Mary. Informed of his son's upcoming wedding in a newspaper, Donny arrives at Cape Cod. Todd, who did not expect the visit, pretends Donny is an old friend, and his father's popularity with the guests annoys him. He initially refuses to see his mother, but after Donny convinces Jamie's family to have the wedding rehearsal away from churches and Todd's friends to have the bachelor party at a strip club, Todd reconciles with him and agrees to the prison meeting. However, as a television crew arrives to film in the middle of Todd and Mary's encounter, Todd leaves in disgust without signing a release form.

Donny then finds out Jamie is having affairs with Steve and her brother, Chad, which she hides by giving Todd a cover story and paying Donny $50,000 to not tell anyone. However, Donny feels guilty for withholding the truth, and he disrupts the wedding to reveal his blood line relation to Todd and Jamie's infidelity and incest. Todd breaks up with her, accepts Donny as his father, quits his job and reclaims his birth name Han Solo. Han later begins dating strip club bartender Brie and offers Donny the money, but Donny declines, insisting on taking responsibility for his actions. While preparing to go to prison to rekindle his relationship with Mary after his sentence is over, the bet he placed on the marathon wins him $160,000, satisfying the IRS.

Cast

Credits adapted from TV Guide.

Production
The film was originally titled I Hate You, Dad, and then changed to Donny's Boy before the producers finally settled on That's My Boy. Filming began on May 2, 2011, and ended on July 15, 2011.

Filming took place in Massachusetts, with studio filming at Columbia Pictures in Culver City, California.

Release

Box office
That's My Boy opened on June 15, 2012, grossing $13,453,714 in its opening weekend, ranking #4 behind the second weekends of Madagascar 3: Europe's Most Wanted and Prometheus, and the opening of Rock of Ages.

The film grossed $36.9 million in the US and $57.7 million worldwide, failing to recoup its $57–70 million budget, making it a financial failure.

Critical response
On Rotten Tomatoes, That's My Boy has an approval rating of 20% based on 115 reviews and an average rating of 3.80/10. The site's critical consensus reads: "While it does represent a new foray into raunch for the normally PG-13 Sandler, That's My Boy finds him repeating himself to diminishing effect – and dragging Andy Samberg down with him." On Metacritic the film has a weighted average score of 31 out of 100 based on reviews from 27 critics, indicating "generally unfavorable reviews". Audiences polled by CinemaScore gave the film an average grade of "B−" on an A to F scale.

Film critic Richard Roeper gave the film an F, calling it "an ugly, tasteless, deadly and mean-spirited piece of filmmaking," and would later call it the worst film of 2012. Justin Chang of Variety called it "a shameless celebration of degenerate behavior, a work of relentless vulgarity and staggering moral idiocy." Half in the Bag called the film "pathetic" and "painful", and went on to criticize Sandler as a comic, suggesting he was unable to create humor that was not based on childish jokes.

Jake McGowan, writing for The Daily Targum, took a different approach. He evaluated the film as a "postmodern, absurdist deconstruction of irony and its impact on critical issues," further stating that Sandler's work "was an artistic reminder that we cannot tackle our traumas or prevent future despair without confronting society's dirty underbelly head-on. We cannot move forward with quips and irony. Critics felt sick after watching the movie because Sandler wanted them to."

The film was criticized for making light of statutory rape, incest, and child neglect.

Home media
That's My Boy was released to DVD and Blu-ray on October 16, 2012 by Sony Pictures Home Entertainment.

Accolades

See also 
 List of films considered the worst
 Mary Kay Letourneau
 Debra Lafave
 Miss Teacher Bangs a Boy

References

External links
 
 
 

2012 films
2012 black comedy films
2010s sex comedy films
American black comedy films
American sex comedy films
2010s English-language films
Films about alcoholism
Films about dysfunctional families
Films about scandalous teacher–student relationships
Films produced by John Morris
Films set in 1984
Films set in 2012
Films set in Massachusetts
Films shot in Massachusetts
Incest in film
Film controversies
Film controversies in the United States
Obscenity controversies in film
Sexual-related controversies in film
Juvenile sexuality in films
Relativity Media films
Happy Madison Productions films
Columbia Pictures films
Films directed by Sean Anders
Films produced by Adam Sandler
Films produced by Allen Covert
Films produced by Jack Giarraputo
Fictional portrayals of the Boston Police Department
Films scored by Rupert Gregson-Williams
Films about rape
Films about father–son relationships
Golden Raspberry Award winning films
2010s American films
Internet memes
Film and television memes